Auguste-Prosper-François, baron Guerrier de Dumast (26 February 1796, Nancy – 26 January 1883, Nancy) was a figure of French Liberal Catholicism and a defender of the city of Nancy (lotharingism).

A member of the Académie de Stanislas, he was also a chevalier of the Order of Charles III and a member of the Société Asiatique.

Works 
1820: La Maçonnerie.
1818–1821: Discours maçonniques des années.
1821–1862: Un mot sur les langues de l'Orient.
1832–1835: Le pour et le contre sur la résurrection des provinces.
1866: Les Initiatives lorraines.
1874: Couronne poétique de la Lorraine.
1868: Morts comparées de la Pologne et de la Lorraine.
1850: Philosophie de l'histoire de Lorraine.

References

Sources 
 .
Diagonales, 1988, 263 p., p.229-236.
 Lucien Adam, Le baron Guerrier de Dumast, Nancy, G. Crépin-Leblond, 1883, 60  p.

External links 
 Auguste-Prosper-François, baron Guerrier de Dumast on Wikisource
 Prosper Guerrier de Dumast dans les « mines de l’Orient
 Preface and translation by Guerrier de Dumast of the Appel aux Grecs by Koraïs (1821)
 Nancy; histoire et tableau. on  Hathitrust

Members of the Société Asiatique
Chevaliers of the Légion d'honneur
1796 births
Writers from Nancy, France
1883 deaths